Blumberg Capital is an early-stage venture capital firm that partners with entrepreneurs to innovate and build technology companies. The firm specializes in leading Seed and Series A rounds collaborating with angel investors, other venture capital firms and strategic partners. Blumberg Capital is headquartered in San Francisco with team members in Tel Aviv, Miami, and New York. Blumberg Capital was founded in 1991 by David J. Blumberg. The firm's investments typically range from $500,000 to $5-million with additional amounts reserved for follow-on funding.

Blumberg Capital invests in early stage capital efficient technology companies in North America, Israel and Europe which are automating the white collar economy by merging big data and artificial intelligence (AI), integrating IT and healthcare, transforming the automotive industry from a product to service, FinTech, PropTech, InsureTech, building data businesses with growing barriers to entry, such a marketplaces, orchestrating and simplifying cybersecurity operations; addressing new challenges, innovating in new domains, including: Deep tech, IoT, drones and space.

Blumberg Capital has an invitation-only council of CIOs that connects members and portfolio company entrepreneurs to provide introductions, forge partnerships and engage in conversations about business and technology trends. With more than 100 members, the Council meets regularly in San Francisco and New York.

On September 17, 2021, Blumberg Capital announced its fifth flagship fund, Blumberg Capital Fund V, an early stage fund to help entrepreneurs use AI, big data, and other transformative technologies to "empower individuals, businesses and society."  The fund raised $225M, the most of any its four previous funds, bringing Blumberg Capital's total amount raised to over $750M. Blumberg Capital Fund V (BCV) portfolio companies include Ferrum Health, Slync.io, and Zone7, among others in the fintech, health tech, supply chain and logistics industries and beyond. Out of 16 new BCV companies, 12 were initially Seed rounds. Blumberg Capital was the first investor in many of these startups, including Braze, DoubleVerify, Katapult and Trulioo.

A number of Blumberg Capital’s growth stage companies such as Addepar, Bento, Braze, DoubleVerify, IntSights, Katapult, Trulioo and Yotpo achieved major milestones or made successful exits in 2021. The firm was named among three big winners, alongside Tiger Global and Providence Equity Partners in “The Big Winners in DoubleVerify’s Public Debut.”

Blumberg backed companies including Addepar, BioCatch, Braze, CaseStack, Check Point, Credorax, Cyvera, Deep Instinct, DoubleVerify, DSP Group, Easyknock, efi, eVoice, Fundbox, HootSuite, Lendio, Namogoo, Nutanix, Parse.ly, SQream DB, WorkJam, Trulioo, CoverHound, IntSights, Ferrum Health, Slync.io, Wunder Mobility, and Apester (Heb).

References

External links
 Blumberg Capital Website
 

Financial services companies established in 1991
Technology companies based in the San Francisco Bay Area
Venture capital firms of the United States